Issue date may refer to:
 Cover date, the date displayed on the covers of periodical publications
 Effective date,  the date upon which something is considered to take effect
 Issue number, a supplementary number used on some debit cards

See also
 Issue (disambiguation)